Montmorency station is a Montreal Metro station in Laval, Quebec, Canada. It is operated by the Société de transport de Montréal (STM) and serves the Orange Line. It is located in the Laval-des-Rapides. The station is part of an extension to Laval and opened on April 28, 2007, becoming the northern terminus of the Orange Line.  After two years of opening, the Metro had generated an extra 60,000 daily passengers, around twice as originally estimated.

Overview  

It is a normal side platform station. This station has the highest ceilings of any station in the network. The wall panels are decorated with tiling in diagonal stripes of retro shades of cyan, navy, straw yellow and brick red.

The station is equipped with the MétroVision information screens which displays news, commercials, and the waiting time until the arrival of the next train.

This station has underground city access to the Université de Montréal’s Laval campus.

Origin of name
The station is located across the street from Cégep Montmorency. The CEGEP got its name from François de Montmorency-Laval (1623–1703), the first bishop of Quebec and New France from 1674 to 1688.

Terminus Montmorency

A large bus terminus with 10 platforms and an indoor waiting area adjoins the station. The building, which is operated by the RTM features an RTM ticket counter as well as a convenience store and a coffee shop. In addition, the station has parking for 1342 cars – 644 free outdoor park and ride spaces and 698 paying spaces (54 outdoor, 644 indoor). The indoor spaces cost $7 a day or $80 per month (if a user purchases a monthly parking pass). All bus traffic enters and leaves on Boulevard de l'Avenir.

Connecting bus routes

Nearby points of interest
 Cégep Montmorency
 Centre Laval
Place Bell

See also 
 ARTM park and ride lots

References

External links
 Montmorency Terminus (RTM)
 Montmorency Station web page 

Accessible Montreal Metro stations
Orange Line (Montreal Metro)
Exo bus stations
Railway stations in Canada opened in 2007
Transport in Laval, Quebec
Buildings and structures in Laval, Quebec
2007 establishments in Quebec